Blhovce is a village and municipality in the Rimavská Sobota District of the Banská Bystrica Region of southern Slovakia.

History
In historical records, the village was first mentioned in 1244 (1244 Bolug, 1427 Balogfalva) . In 1427 it belonged to the paladin Juraj of Ratold. In the 16th century it belong to Feledyi and Perényi families. During the 16th century it suffered because of Turks and during the 17th century due to the  Polish-Lithuanian War. In the 18th century it passed to the Koháry family and to several zemans.

Genealogical resources

The records for genealogical research are available at the state archive "Statny Archiv in Banska Bystrica, Slovakia"

 Roman Catholic church records (births/marriages/deaths): 1762-1897 (parish B)

See also
 List of municipalities and towns in Slovakia

External links

https://web.archive.org/web/20071116010355/http://www.statistics.sk/mosmis/eng/run.html
http://www.gemer.org/blhovce-balogfalva-o68-uvod.html
http://www.e-obce.sk/obec/blhovce/blhovce.html
Surnames of living people in Blhovce

Villages and municipalities in Rimavská Sobota District
Hungarian communities in Slovakia